"Y'a pas que les grands qui rêvent" is the a 1989 song by Belgian singer Melody. Written by Guy Carlier and Jean-Pierre Millers, it was released as her debut single in August 1989, when she was 12-years-old. Later, it was included on Melody's debut album, Danse ta vie, released in 1991. It achieved success in France, peaking at number two for one month.

Chart performance
In France, "Y'a pas que les grands qui rêvent" debuted at number 43 on the chart edition of 19 August 1989, climbed and reached the top ten in its sixth week, and eventually spent consecutive four weeks at number two in November, being blocked by Jive Bunny & The Mastermixers' "Swing the Mood" which topped the chart then. It remained for 19 weeks in the top ten and 28 weeks in the top 50. It achieved Gold status, awarded by the Syndicat National de l'Édition Phonographique. On the Eurochart Hot 100 Singles, it debuted at number 96 on 30 September 1989, reached a peak of number 12 in its 11th week, and fell off the chart after 21 weeks of presence, nine of them in the top 20.

Cover versions 
The song was covered and released in July 2021 by 12-year-old French singer Valentina.

Track listings 
 7" single
 "Y'a pas que les grands qui rêvent" — 3:40
 "Y'a pas que les grands qui rêvent" (instrumental) — 3:40

Charts

Weekly charts

Year-end charts

Certifications

References

External links 
 

1989 songs
1989 debut singles
Melody (Belgian singer) songs
Carrere Records singles
Valentina (singer) songs